The 2004 Armageddon was the fifth Armageddon professional wrestling pay-per-view (PPV) event produced by World Wrestling Entertainment (WWE). It was held exclusively for wrestlers from the promotion's SmackDown! brand division. The event took place on December 12, 2004, at the Gwinnett Center in the Atlanta suburb of Duluth, Georgia. Nine professional wrestling matches were scheduled on the event's card.

All four championships exclusive to the SmackDown! brand were contested for; one was lost while the other three were retained. The main event was a Fatal-Four Way match for the WWE Championship involving Eddie Guerrero, champion John "Bradshaw" Layfield (JBL), Booker T and The Undertaker, which JBL won after pinning Booker. One of the predominant matches on the undercard was The Big Show versus Kurt Angle, Mark Jindrak, and Luther Reigns in a Handicap match. Big Show won the match after pinning Jindrak following an F-5. Another primary match on the card was John Cena versus Jesús in a Street Fight for the WWE United States Championship, which Cena won by pinfall after executing an FU.

Production

Background
Armageddon was established in 1999 as World Wrestling Entertainment's (WWE) December pay-per-view (PPV) and was held every year except in 2001. The 2004 event was held on December 12 at the Gwinnett Center in the Atlanta suburb of Duluth, Georgia. It was the fifth event in the Armageddon chronology. While the previous year featured wrestlers exclusively from the Raw brand, the 2004 event was SmackDown!-exclusive.

Storylines

The main feud heading into Armageddon was between John "Bradshaw" Layfield (JBL), Booker T, Eddie Guerrero, and The Undertaker over the WWE Championship. At Survivor Series, JBL faced Booker for the WWE Championship. Before the match began, JBL announced that if he lost the match he would leave professional wrestling forever. JBL won the match and retained the title after hitting Booker with the WWE Championship belt. On the November 18 episode of SmackDown!, JBL, Guerrero, Booker and Undertaker were all arguing over who should be the next number one contender for the WWE Championship. SmackDown! general manager Theodore Long then announced that JBL would be defending the WWE Championship against Guerrero, Booker and Undertaker at Armageddon. be  On the November 25 episode of SmackDown!, JBL and Orlando Jordan faced Booker and Guerrero in a tag team match. JBL and Jordan won the match following interference from the Basham Brothers. When the match was over, Undertaker came out and attacked JBL's cabinet followed by executing a Tombstone Piledriver to JBL. On the December 9 episode of SmackDown!, Long booked JBL, Jordan, and The Basham Brothers to face, Guerrero, Booker and Undertaker in a 7-man handicap tag team match in the main event. Undertaker, Booker and Guerrero won the match. Long announced that The Cabinet would not be at ringside and if they interfered in the match then JBL would be stripped of the WWE Championship.

A secondary feud heading into Armageddon was between John Cena and Jesús over the WWE United States Championship. The feud started on the October 7 episode of SmackDown!, when Cena was interrupted by the debuting Carlito. Carlito stated that he wanted a United States title shot, which Cena agreed to. Later that night, Cena lost the United States Championship to Carlito after being hit in the head with his signature chain. On the October 14 episode of SmackDown!, SmackDown! General Manager Therdore Long announced that Cena had been involved in an after hours bar fight. Long said that Cena had been (kayfabe) stabbed in the kidney by Carlito's bodyguard, Jesús. The feud restarted at Survivor Series, when Cena returned from his injury. On the November 18 episode of SmackDown!, Cena stated that he wanted revenge on Carlito and his United States Championship back. Cena defeated Carlito (who had suffered a legitimate shoulder injury) to regain the title, but after the match Jesús attacked Cena in the injured kidney, which forced Cena to be taken out on a stretcher.

Event

Before the event went live on pay-per-view, Akio and Billy Kidman defeated Paul London and Chavo Guerrero Jr., which was taped for Sunday Night Heat.

Preliminary matches
The first match was for the WWE Tag Team Championship between the team of Rob Van Dam and Rey Mysterio Jr. and the team of René Duprée and Kenzo Suzuki, who were accompanied by Hiroko. The match started off with both teams getting the advantage. During the match, Torrie Wilson came down and attacked Hiroko. Mysterio executed a 619 on Dupree and Suzuki and Van Dam performed a Five-Star Frog Splash to Dupree to retain the title.

In the second match Kurt Angle faced Santa Claus. Angle forced Santa to submit to the Ankle lock to win the match.

In the third match Daniel Puder faced Mike Mizanin in a Dixie Dog Fight for the Tough Enough Championship. The match went through every 3-minute round. Puder won the match and the Tough Enough Championship by judge's decision.

The Basham Brothers (Doug Basham and Danny Basham) versus Hardcore Holly and Charlie Haas was next. After Holly was distracted by Dawn Marie and Miss Jackie brawling, Danny pinned Holly with an Inside Cradle to win the match for his team.

In the next match John Cena faced Jesús in a Street Fight for the United States Championship. The match started with Cena gaining the advantage. Both men hit each other with a cane. Cena hit Jesus with a kendo stick, piece of metal and a trashcan lid. Cena executed an FU on Jesús to retain the title. After the match, Cena hit Carlito with his chain.

The sixth match of the event was Dawn Marie versus Miss Jackie with Charlie Haas as the special guest referee. Marie won the match with a roll-up while holding Jackie's tights.

Main event matches
In the next match was The Big Show faced Kurt Angle, Mark Jindrak and Luther Reigns in a Handicap match. Big Show dominated the match. Angle executed an Angle slam on Show and applied the Ankle lock, but Show countered. Show executed an F-500 on Jindrak to win the match.

In the next match, Spike Dudley faced Funaki for the WWE Cruiserweight Championship. Spike countered a Tornado DDT and attempted the Dudley Dog but Funaki Bridge pinned Dudley to win the title.

In the main event, John "Bradshaw" Layfield (JBL) faced Eddie Guerrero, Booker T and The Undertaker in a Fatal-Four Way match for the WWE Championship. The stipulation was if The Cabinet interfered in the match then JBL would be stripped of the title. As the match began, JBL retreated as the other three fought each other. Undertaker performed a side slam on JBL and threw Booker T over the barricade. JBL tried to Powerbomb Undertaker through a broadcast table but Undertaker countered with a back body drop. Undertaker executed Old School on Booker and a guillotine leg drop on Guerrero. JBL performed a JBL Bomb onto a broadcast table and an Elbow Drop through the table on Booker. Undertaker executed a Last Ride through a broadcast table on JBL. Guerrero executed two frog splashes on Undertaker but Undertaker sat up. Guerrero hit Undertaker with the ladder and executed a frog splash off the ladder but JBL pulled the referee out of the ring. Undertaker chokeslammed the other three and attempted a Tombstone Piledriver but Heidenreich attacked him. JBL pinned Booker and Eddie, who both kicked out. Heidenreich pulled Undertaker from the ring and applied a cobra clutch on Undertaker. JBL executed a Clothesline from Hell on Booker to retain the title.

Aftermath
After the pay-per-view, the feud between JBL, Undertaker, Guerrero, and Booker slowly died down. JBL went to feud with the Big Show and Kurt Angle over the WWE Championship, which would end at No Way Out. Undertaker went to feud with Heidenreich, which led to a Casket match at the Royal Rumble, which Undertaker won despite the interference by Gene Snitsky and Undertaker's brother Kane and ended their feud. Cena and Carlito's feud ended after the event, as Cena went on to win a tournament at No Way Out to challenge JBL for the WWE Championship at WrestleMania. Cena went on to win the WWE Championship from JBL at WrestleMania, and held the title until January 2006, even after being drafted to the Raw brand.

Results

References

External links
 Official Armageddon 2004 website

2004 in Georgia (U.S. state)
Professional wrestling in Georgia (U.S. state)
Events in Duluth, Georgia
2004
2004 WWE pay-per-view events
December 2004 events in the United States
WWE SmackDown